Tarsonops is a genus of araneomorph spiders in the family Caponiidae, first described by Ralph Vary Chamberlin in 1924.

Species
 it contains seven species:
Tarsonops ariguanabo (Alayón, 1986) — Cuba, Panama
Tarsonops clavis Chamberlin, 1924 — Mexico
Tarsonops coronilla Sánchez-Ruiz & Brescovit, 2015 — Mexico
Tarsonops irataylori Bond & Taylor, 2013 — Belize
Tarsonops sectipes Chamberlin, 1924 — Mexico
Tarsonops sternalis (Banks, 1898) — Mexico
Tarsonops systematicus Chamberlin, 1924 — Mexico

References

Caponiidae
Araneomorphae genera